The 1986 Pan American Women's Handball Championship was the first edition of the Pan American Women's Handball Championship, held in Brazil from 20 to 25 August 1985. It acted as the American qualifying tournament for the 1986 World Women's Handball Championship.

Standings

Results
Results are:

References

External links
 
Results on todor66.com

1986 Women
American Women's Handball Championship
American Women's Handball Championship
Pan
August 1985 sports events in South America